Rosich, meaning "Rus person" in some Slavic languages, is a surname. Notable persons with that name include:

Josep Rosich, former president of the Catalonia Football Federation
Vanna Marie Rosich, now Vanna White (born 1957), American television personality and film actress

See also
Rusich (disambiguation)
Rosic
Rusic